Joseph Nikolaevich Knebel (21 September 1854 in Buchach – 14 August 1926 in Moscow) was a Russian publisher. Knebel founded Russia's first specialized publishing house for fine art.

References

External links

1854 births
1926 deaths
People from Buchach
Russian publishers (people)
University of Vienna alumni